Szilvia Ruff (born 19 February 1976) is a Hungarian former football striker. She played for László Korház SC, Renova FC and 1.FC Femina in the Hungarian Championship. She was the championship's top scorer in 1996 and 1998 with 27 and 30 goals respectively.

She was a member of the Hungarian national team for twelve years.

References

1976 births
Living people
Women's association football forwards
Hungarian women's footballers
Hungary women's international footballers
László Kórház SC players
Renova players
1. FC Femina players